Lorenzo Centurione (Genoa, 1645 - Genoa, 1735) was the 143rd Doge of the Republic of Genoa and king of Corsica.

Biography 
On September 26, 1715, the Grand Council elected him new doge of the Republic of Genoa, the ninety-eighth in biennial succession and the one hundred and forty-third in republican history. As doge he was also invested with the related biennial office of king of Corsica. Once the mandate ended on September 26, 1717, Lorenzo Centurione held other public offices. He died in Genoa around 1735.

See also 

 Republic of Genoa
 Doge of Genoa

References 

18th-century Doges of Genoa
1645 births
1735 deaths